The Singapore Psychological Society (SPS) was founded in 1979 by a small group of psychologists, and has since grown to over 1,150 members (2020), about 480 of which are registered psychologists in Singapore. 

During the COVID-19 outbreak in Singapore, the SPS offered psychological counselling pro bono or at reduced rates.

References

External links 
 

Singaporean voluntary welfare organisations